Nerestce is a municipality in Písek District in the South Bohemian Region of the Czech Republic. It has about 100 inhabitants.

Administrative parts
The municipality is made up of villages of Dolní Nerestce and Horní Nerestce.

References

Villages in Písek District